John Austin is a former American football player and coach. He served as the head football coach at the University of South Dakota from 1999 to 2003, compiling a record of 22–32. Austin is a former South Dakota Coyotes football player who served on the staff of Hayden Fry at the University of Iowa from 1991 to 1998.

Head coaching record

References

Year of birth missing (living people)
Living people
American football linebackers
Iowa Hawkeyes football coaches
South Dakota Coyotes football coaches
South Dakota Coyotes football players
University of Iowa alumni